Josephine Caulfield (born 26 September 1965) is a British actress, writer and comedian.

Biography
Born in Wales to Irish parents, she was brought up in Derbyshire and Leicestershire, England.

At 17, Caulfield moved to London. For two years she lived in a squat in Kilburn Park, West London, and played drums in a rockabilly band. Heavily influenced by The Cramps and The Fleshtones the band went nowhere fast due to their "lack of songs, musical ability and talent. But we did wear nice clothes" (Jo Caulfield, Radio 4 interview).

Career
Deciding she wanted to get into comedy, Caulfield worked as a waitress during the day, saved up her tips, bought a small microphone and amplifier, and opened her own comedy club. After meeting her partner, the couple agreed a two-year plan to either make it or give up. Caulfield was soon writing for Graham Norton, getting her own gigs and doing a BBC Radio 4 show.

Writer/comedian
In 2010, Jo Caulfield was nominated as 'Funniest Woman 2010' (LAFTA Awards). She has previously been nominated as 'Best Female Comedian 2002' (Chortle Awards), 'Best Compere 2004' (Chortle Awards) and one of 'The 100 Greatest Stand-Ups' (Channel 4).

She has appeared at major comedy clubs, both in the UK and overseas, and has completed two solo nationwide tours, and a further three as support act of Graham Norton, Puppetry of the Penis and Rory Bremner. For the last nine years, Caulfield has taken a new solo comedy show to the Edinburgh Fringe.

Caulfield was Comedy Writer/Programme Consultant for all five series of the BAFTA Award-winning So Graham Norton. She was also head writer on both Ruby Wax's Waiting Game and Zoe Ball's 'Strictly Dance Fever' (BBC3). Caulfield has also written for Joan Rivers, Anne Robinson, Denise Van Outen and Ant & Dec among others.

Caulfield's first CD, Thinking Bad Thoughts, was released via iTunes in October 2012.

She currently hosts a regular spoken word/comedy evening at the Scottish Storytelling Centre in Edinburgh called The Speakeasy.

She was joint winner of the 2021 Circuit Comedian of the Year.

Television
Caulfield's TV appearances include Never Mind The Buzzcocks, Mock the Week, The Stand-up Show, The Comedy Store, The World Stands Up, Have I Got News For You, Argumental, The Politics Show and Michael McIntyre's Comedy Roadshow.
 
In November 2008 Caulfield presented a video piece for BBC1's The One Show about Charles Darwin. Caulfield visited the Darwin exhibition at the Natural History Museum to see what Darwin thought were the pros and cons of marriage.

In March 2010 Caulfield had her set at London's Comedy Store filmed for the up-and-coming The Comedy Store series on Comedy Central.

In April 2010 Caulfield presented a piece for BBC1's The Politics Show. Filmed at the Harrogate Theatre during her 'Won't Shut Up' tour Caulfield canvassed the audience about their views on politics, politicians and the 2010 election campaign.

She is also a TV warm-up artist, and is the regular warm-up for Have I Got News for You (with two appearances as a contestant). Other TV shows she regularly worked on include V Graham Norton, Alistair McGowan's Big Impression, Bremner, Bird and Fortune, Gimme Gimme Gimme, Two Pints of Lager and a Packet of Crisps, and Perfect World.

Acting credits include Family Affairs, Days Like These, Beast, and Get Real.

Radio
She has been a regular guest on many radio shows: It's Been a Bad Week, The Fred MacAulay Show, The Motion Show, Parsons and Naylor's Pull-Out Section, Quote... Unquote, The Sunday Programme (LBC Radio), The Now Show and Twenty Twenty.

In January 2006 Caulfield recorded her own Radio 4 comedy series: It's That Jo Caulfield Again to much critical acclaim. The Times, The Guardian, The Observer, The Evening Standard and Heat Magazine all made the show their "Pick of the Day". The series was primarily written by Caulfield, and featured regular cast members Vicky Pepperdine, Dave Mounfield and Simon Greenall.

A second series, featuring Sharon Horgan, Alan Francis and Simon Greenall, went out in June 2007.

In December 2007 the third series of It's That Jo Caulfield Again was broadcast. The cast: Zoe Lyons, Marian Pashley, Moray Hunter and Simon Greenall.

In November 2009 a new series, Jo Caulfield Won't Shut Up!, went out in the 6.30pm comedy slot on Radio 4. The series was primarily written by Jo Caulfield, and featured regular cast members Zoe Lyons, Nick Revel and Simon Greenall. The first show was recorded live at the Edinburgh Festival, with special guest Paul Sneedon.

In June 2010 Jo Caulfield Won't Shut Up! was repeated in the 11 o'clock slot on Radio 4.

In July/August 2012 Jo presented Laughing In All The Right Places for BBC Scotland.

Live shows 
2001
Jo Caulfield – It's Not That Important (Pleasance Dome/Edinburgh Festival)
2002
Jo Caulfield – Live (Pleasance Upstairs/Edinburgh Festival)
2003
Jo Caulfield – It's That Jo Caulfield Again (Pleasance Cabaret Bar/Edinburgh Festival
2004
Jo Caulfield – Role Model (Pleasance Queen Dome/Edinburgh Festival)
2005
Jo Caulfield – Who Are You? (Pleasance Cavern/Edinburgh Festival)
2006
Jo Caulfield – Emotional Warfare (Pleasance Queen Dome/Edinburgh Festival)
2007
Jo Caulfield – Goes To Hell (Assembly Rooms/Edinburgh Festival)
2008
Jo Caulfield – Two-Faced Bitch? (Stand Comedy Club/Edinburgh Festival)
2009
Jo Caulfield – Won't Shut Up! (Stand Comedy Club/Edinburgh Festival)
2010
Jo Caulfield – Cruel To Be Kind (Stand Comedy Club/Edinburgh Festival)
2012
Jo Caulfield – Thinking Bad Thoughts (Stand Comedy Club/Edinburgh Festival)
2014
Jo Caulfield – Cancel My Subscription (Stand Comedy Club/Edinburgh Festival)
2015
Jo Caulfield – Awkward Conversations (Stand Comedy Club/Edinburgh Festival)
2016
Jo Caulfield – Pretending To Care (Stand Comedy Club/Edinburgh Festival)
2017
Jo Caulfield – Older Wiser Smarter Meaner (Stand Comedy Club/Edinburgh Festival)
2018
Jo Caulfield – Killing Time (Stand Comedy Club/Edinburgh Festival)
2019
Jo Caulfield – Voodoo Doll (Stand Comedy Club/Edinburgh Festival)

UK tours

2006 Jo Caulfield Live:
2008 Jo Caulfield Goes To Hell:
2010 Jo Caulfield Won't Shut Up
2012 Better The Devil You Know

References

External links
Official site
Jo Caulfield Blog
Jo Caulfield Radio Show
Den of Geek interview

1965 births
Living people
English people of Irish descent
English stand-up comedians
English women comedians
20th-century squatters
People from Derbyshire
Television personalities from Leicestershire
Actors from Leicestershire
20th-century English comedians
21st-century English comedians